The 2022 Brent London Borough Council election took place on 5 May 2022. All 57 members of Brent London Borough Council were to be elected. The elections took place alongside local elections in the other London boroughs and elections to local authorities across the United Kingdom.

In the previous election in 2018, the Labour Party maintained its control of the council, winning 60 out of the 63 seats with the Conservative Party forming the council opposition with the remaining three seats. The 2022 election took place under new election boundaries, which reduced the number of councillors to 57.

Background

History 

The thirty-two London boroughs were established in 1965 by the London Government Act 1963. They are the principal authorities in Greater London and have responsibilities including education, housing, planning, highways, social services, libraries, recreation, waste, environmental health and revenue collection. Some of the powers are shared with the Greater London Authority, which also manages passenger transport, police and fire.

Since its formation, Brent has been variously under Labour control, no overall control and Conservative control. Only Labour, Conservative and Liberal Democrat councillors have been elected to the council. The council has had an overall Labour majority since the 2010 election, in which Labour won 40 seats, the Liberal Democrats won 17 and the Conservatives won six. The Liberal Democrats lost all but one of their seats in the 2014 election before losing their final seat in the most recent election in 2018. The 2018 result saw Labour win 60 seats with 57.6% of the overall vote, and the Conservatives win three with 22.5% of the overall vote. The Liberal Democrats received 12.6% of votes across the borough and the Green Party received 5.6% of the vote, but neither won any seats. The incumbent leader of the council is Muhammed Butt, who has held that position since 2014.

Council term 
Michael Pavey, a Labour councillor for Barnhill ward, resigned in November 2019, citing family reasons. In May 2016, while serving as deputy leader of the council, he had unsuccessfully challenged Butt for the leadership of the council. Later in 2016 he resigned from the council's cabinet because he disagreed with Butt about how to implement cuts. Another Labour councillor for the same ward, Sarah Marquis, resigned days later, citing family and personal reasons. A Labour councillor for Wembley Central ward, Luke Patterson, resigned in the same month citing personal reasons. By-elections to replace all three, in addition to James Allie, a Labour councillor for Alperton who resigned, were held on 23 January 2020. Allie was reportedly suspended from the party. The Labour candidate to replace Allie, Chetan Harpale, was suspended from his party during the campaign to investigate alleged Islamophobia. Harpale lost the election, with the Liberal Democrat candidate Anton Georgiou being elected. The other three by-elections were all held by Labour on reduced majorities.

In 2021, a Labour councillor for Brondesbury Park, Kieron Gill, resigned, declining to explain his reasons. Earlier in 2021 he had been the only Labour councillor to abstain on the council budget. The by-election was held on 6 May 2021, on the same date as the 2021 London mayoral and London Assembly elections. The Labour candidate, Gwen Grahl, was elected. Earlier that week, the Labour candidate Abdirazak Abdi resigned from the Labour group to sit as an independent councillor.

Along with most other London boroughs, Brent was subject to a boundary review ahead of the 2022 election. The Local Government Boundary Commission for England concluded that the council should have 57 seats, a reduction of six, and produced new election boundaries following a period of consultation. The new boundaries comprise thirteen three-councillor wards and nine two-councillor wards.

Electoral process 
Brent, like other London borough councils, elects all of its councillors at once every four years. The previous election took place in 2018. The election took place by multi-member first-past-the-post voting, with each ward being represented by two or three councillors. Electors had as many votes as there are councillors to be elected in their ward, with the top two or three being elected.

All registered electors (British, Irish, Commonwealth and European Union citizens) living in London aged 18 or over were entitled to vote in the election. People who lived at two addresses in different councils, such as university students with different term-time and holiday addresses, were entitled to be registered for and vote in elections in both local authorities. Voting in-person at polling stations will take place from 7:00 to 22:00 on election day, and voters will be able to apply for postal votes or proxy votes in advance of the election.

Previous council composition

Results summary

Ward results 
Statements of persons nominated were published on 6 April. Sitting councillors are marked with an asterisk (*) although as ward boundaries have changed significantly, they cannot strictly be called "incumbent" as existing council wards will cease to exist upon the election of the new Council.

Alperton

Barnhill

Brondesbury Park

Cricklewood and Mapesbury

Dollis Hill

Harlesden and Kensal Green

Kenton

Kilburn

Kingsbury

Northwick Park

Preston

Queens Park

Queensbury

Roundwood

Stonebridge

Sudbury

Tokyngton

Welsh Harp

Wembley Central

Wembley Hill

Wembley Park

Willesden Green

References 

Council elections in the London Borough of Brent
Brent